Einar Halvorsen (7 March 1872 – 23 April 1964) was a Norwegian speedskater. 

He set world record in 500 m three times, twice in 5000 m, and once in 1500 m.  

His time 2.29,6 in 1500 m in 1894 made him the first person to finish the distance in less than 2.30.

World records 

Source: SpeedSkatingStats.com

References

1872 births
1964 deaths
Norwegian male speed skaters
World record setters in speed skating